Andrew Joseph Steven (born 21 May 1985) is a Scottish professional basketball player with the Scotland national basketball team. Currently playing in Spain for Quintanar del Rey in the national 1 division. He also has had short spells with the Scottish Rocks on two occasions. He played for St. Mirren basketball club for 9 years before moving to Spain on 30 August 2007. He scored 28 points in a record breaking victory for Scotland Universities against England in his second year with the team (2005–2007). He currently holds a BUSA record for most points in a game at 86, in an overtime win against Napier University. He plays the shooting guard position and wears the number 6 jersey.

References

1985 births
Living people
Sportspeople from East Ayrshire
Scottish men's basketball players
Shooting guards
Glasgow Rocks players